Rebecca Sharp may refer to:

Fiction 
Becky Sharp, the anti-heroine in the 1847 novel Vanity Fair and numerous adaptations into other media
Becky Sharp (film), 1935 film based on Vanity Fair

People 
Rebecca Joy Sharp (born 1979), Scottish harpist, collaborator with poet Josephine Dickinson
Rebecca Sharp, American paralegal charged in connection with drug charges against Andrew C. Thornton II

Other 
Rebecca Sharp (horse), thoroughbred horse trained by Geoff Wragg

See also
Rebecca (disambiguation)
Sharp (disambiguation)